The U.S. Post Office in Mayfield, Kentucky was built in 1910.  It was listed on the National Register of Historic Places in 1982.

References

National Register of Historic Places in Graves County, Kentucky
Neoclassical architecture in Kentucky
Government buildings completed in 1910
1910 establishments in Kentucky
Post office buildings on the National Register of Historic Places in Kentucky